Duane Cousins is an Australian former racewalker, born in Bendigo, who competed in the 1996 Summer Olympics and in the 2000 Summer Olympics.

References

1973 births
Living people
Sportspeople from Bendigo
Australian male racewalkers
Olympic athletes of Australia
Athletes (track and field) at the 1996 Summer Olympics
Athletes (track and field) at the 2000 Summer Olympics
Athletes (track and field) at the 1998 Commonwealth Games
Athletes (track and field) at the 2002 Commonwealth Games
Athletes (track and field) at the 2006 Commonwealth Games
Commonwealth Games medallists in athletics
Commonwealth Games silver medallists for Australia
20th-century Australian people
21st-century Australian people
Medallists at the 1998 Commonwealth Games